Cryptolechia similifloralis is a moth in the family Depressariidae. It was described by Wang in 2006. It is found in the Chinese provinces of Hubei and Sichuan.

The length of the forewings is about 12 mm. The forewings are dark brown, with an orange-yellow fascia extending from the costal margin at about two-fifths length to the dorsum at two-thirds length. There is also a weak black dot at the middle of the cell, the end of the cell and the middle of the fold. The costal margin has an orange-yellow dot at the distal one-fifth. The hindwings are light brown.

Etymology
The specific name refers to the flowerlike distal part of aedeagus and is derived from Latin simil- (meaning similar) and floralis (meaning flower).

References

Moths described in 2006
Cryptolechia (moth)